Sherman Dillard (born September 1, 1955) is a former American basketball player and current coach. He was a head men's basketball coach at Indiana State University and at James Madison as well as an assistant at Maryland, California and Georgia Tech. Currently, he is an assistant basketball coach at the University of Iowa.  Prior to being hired at Iowa in May 2010, he was a basketball representative for Nike.

Dillard was the sixth round pick in the 1978 NBA Draft by the Indiana Pacers.

He resigned his position at Indiana State in order to replace Lefty Driesell at his alma mater, James Madison University.  He had previously worked as an assistant coach for Lefty at the University of Maryland in the early 1980s.

Head coaching record

References

External links
 Iowa profile

1955 births
Living people
Basketball coaches from Virginia
Basketball players from Virginia
California Golden Bears men's basketball coaches
College men's basketball head coaches in the United States
Georgia Tech Yellow Jackets men's basketball coaches
Indiana Pacers draft picks
Indiana State Sycamores men's basketball coaches
Iowa Hawkeyes men's basketball coaches
James Madison Dukes men's basketball coaches
James Madison Dukes men's basketball players
Maryland Terrapins men's basketball coaches
American men's basketball players
Guards (basketball)